|}

The Peter Marsh Chase is a Grade 2 National Hunt chase in Great Britain which is open to horses aged five years or older. It is run at Haydock Park over a distance of about 3 miles 1½ furlongs (3 miles 1 furlong and 125 yards, or 5,144 metres), and during its running there are nineteen fences to be jumped. It is a limited handicap race, and it is scheduled to take place each year in January. It was first run in 1981.

Records
Most successful horse (2 wins):
 Jodami – 1993,1997
 Royal Pagaille -  2021, 2022 

Leading jockey (4 wins):
 Danny Cook –  Our Vic (2010), Cloudy Too (2016), Wakanda (2019), Vintage Clouds (2020)

Leading trainer (5 wins):
 Sue Smith – The Last Fling (2000), 	Artic Jack (2004), Cloudy Too (2016), Wakanda (2019), Vintage Clouds (2020)

Winners
 Weights given in stones and pounds.

See also
 Horse racing in Great Britain
 List of British National Hunt races

References
 Racing Post:

 pedigreequery.com – Peter Marsh Handicap Chase – Haydock.

External links
 Race Recordings 1981, 1983–2003 

National Hunt races in Great Britain
Haydock Park Racecourse
National Hunt chases
Recurring sporting events established in 1981
1981 establishments in England